Alexandre Veuthey (born 14 January 1993) is a Swiss professional footballer currently playing for FC Stade Nyonnais.

Career
Veuthey began playing at FC Lausanne-Sport where he rose through the youth ranks. He eventually made his debut on 12 May 2010 against Gossau in a league match. In July 2012 he moved on to FC Stade Nyonnais on a free transfer.

External links
 Career history at ASF
 

1993 births
Living people
Swiss men's footballers
Association football defenders
FC Lausanne-Sport players
FC Stade Nyonnais players